The State University of New York (SUNY) is a system of public colleges and universities in the State of New York. It is one of the largest comprehensive system of universities, colleges, and community colleges in the United States. Led by chancellor John B. King, the SUNY system has 91,182 employees, including 32,496 faculty members, and some 7,660 degree and certificate programs overall and a $13.08 billion budget. Its flagship universities are Stony Brook University on Long Island and the University at Buffalo.

SUNY's administrative offices are in Albany, the state's capital, with satellite offices in Manhattan and Washington, D.C. With 25,000 acres of land, SUNY's largest campus is SUNY College of Environmental Science and Forestry, which neighbors the State University of New York Upstate Medical University—the largest employer in the SUNY system with over 10,959 employees.

The State University of New York was established in 1948 by Governor Thomas E. Dewey, through legislative implementation of recommendations made by the Temporary Commission on the Need for a State University (1946–1948). The commission was chaired by Owen D. Young, who was at the time Chairman of General Electric. The system was greatly expanded during the administration of Governor Nelson A. Rockefeller, who took a personal interest in design and construction of new SUNY facilities across the state.

Apart from units of the unrelated City University of New York (CUNY), SUNY comprises all state-supported institutions of higher education.

History

New York is one of the last states to set up a state college and university system. The first colleges were established privately, with some arising from local seminaries. But New York state had a long history of supported higher education prior to the creation of the SUNY system. The oldest college that is part of the SUNY System is SUNY Potsdam, established in 1816 as the St. Lawrence Academy. In 1835, the State Legislature acted to establish stronger programs for public school teacher preparation and designated one academy in each senatorial district to receive money for a special teacher-training department. The St. Lawrence Academy received this distinction and designated the village of Potsdam as the site of a Normal School in 1867.

On May 7, 1844, the State legislature voted to establish New York State Normal School in Albany as the first college for teacher education. In 1865, the privately endowed Cornell University was designated as New York's land grant college, and it began direct financial support of four of Cornell's colleges in 1894. From 1889 to 1903, Cornell operated the New York State College of Forestry, until the Governor vetoed its annual appropriation. The school was moved to Syracuse University in 1911. It is now the State University of New York College of Environmental Science and Forestry. In 1908, the State legislature began the NY State College of Agriculture at Alfred University.

In 1946-48 a Temporary Commission on the Need for a State University, chaired by Owen D. Young, Chairman of the General Electric Company, studied New York's existing higher education institutions. It was known New York's private institutions of higher education were highly discriminatory and failed to provide for many New Yorkers. Noting this need, the commission recommended the creation of a public state university system. In 1948 legislation was passed establishing SUNY on the foundation of the teacher-training schools established in the 19th century. Most of them had already developed curricula similar to those found at four-year liberal arts schools long before the creation of SUNY, as evidenced by the fact they had become known as "Colleges for Teachers" rather than "Teachers' Colleges."

On October 8, 1953, SUNY took a historic step of banning all national fraternities and sororities from its 33 campuses.  The resolution was passed as an attempt to combat discrimination based on race or religion in many national organizations at the time. Various fraternities challenged this rule in court since it did not distinguish between those with discriminatory clauses in their by-laws and those who didn't. The SUNY resolution which was upheld in court states:
Resolved that no social organization shall be permitted in any state-operated unit of the State University which has any direct or indirect affiliation or connection with any national or other organization outside the particular unit; and be it further
Resolved that no such social organization, in policy or practice, shall operate under any rule which bars students on account of race, color, religion, creed, national origin or other artificial criteria; and be it further

Resolved that the President be, and hereby is, authorized to take such steps as he may deem appropriate to implement this policy, including the determination of which student organizations are social as distinguished from scholastic or religious, and his decision shall be final.

Despite being one of the last states in the nation to establish a state university, the system was quickly expanded during the chancellorship of Samuel B. Gould and the administration of Governor Nelson A. Rockefeller, who took a personal interest in the design and construction of new SUNY facilities across the state. Rockefeller championed the acquisition of the private University of Buffalo into the SUNY system, making the public State University of New York at Buffalo.

Organization 
SUNY is governed by a State University of New York Board of Trustees, which consists of eighteen members, fifteen of whom are appointed by the Governor, with consent of the New York State Senate. The sixteenth member is the president of The State University of New York Student Assembly. The last two members are the presidents of the University Faculty Senate and Faculty Council of Community Colleges, both of whom are non-voting. The board of trustees appoints the chancellor who serves as SUNY Chief Executive Officer.

The state of New York assists in financing the SUNY system, which, along with CUNY, provides lower-cost college-level education to residents of the state. SUNY students also come from out-of-state and 171 foreign countries, though tuition is higher for these students. Although tuition is higher for these non-resident students, their tuition is subsidized by New York State taxpayers.

There is a large variety of colleges in the SUNY system with some overlap in specialties between sites. SUNY divides its campuses into four distinct categories: university centers/doctoral-granting institutions, comprehensive colleges, technology colleges, and community colleges. SUNY also includes statutory colleges, state-funded colleges within other institutions such as Cornell University and Alfred University. Students at the statutory colleges who are residents of New York state receive the benefit of state-subsidized tuition while enjoying all of the campus life amenities of the host institutions.

SUNY and the City University of New York (CUNY) are different university systems, both receiving funding from New York State. Also, SUNY is not to be confused with the University of the State of New York (USNY), which is the governmental umbrella organization for most education-related institutions and many education-related personnel (both public and private) in New York State, and which includes, as components, the New York State Education Department and the New York State University Police.

Presidents and chancellors

Student representation
 

The SUNY Board of Trustees has a voting student member on the board. The student trustee serves a dual role as the President of the Student Assembly of the State University of New York (SUNYSA). SUNYSA is the recognized student government of the SUNY system.

In the 1970s, students pressed for voting representation on the governing board of SUNY colleges. In 1971, the State Legislature added five student voting members to Cornell's board of trustees. However, at that time, all members of a board must be over the age of 21 for a corporation to hold a liquor license, so to allow Cornell to retain its license, the legislature had to go back to amend NYS Alcoholic Beverage Control Law § 126(4) to require half the board must be 21.

In 1975, the legislature added a non-voting student seat to the boards of all SUNY units. Two Attorney General of the State of New York opinion letters reduced the parliamentary rights of the student members to participate at meetings and indicated they were not in fact Public Officers, and arguably subject to personal liability from lawsuits. In 1977, another statutory amendment made student members of SUNY councils and boards subject to the NYS Public Officers Law or NYS General Municipal Law and granted student representatives parliamentary powers of moving or seconding motions and of placing items on the agendas of the bodies. Finally, the legislature gave full voting rights to the student members in 1979, resulting in the students of all SUNY units having voting representatives, except for the NYS College of Environmental Science and Forestry. Finally, in 1986, the legislature gave the student representative of that college voting rights as well.

Libraries
The SUNY Libraries Consortium (SLC) is an independent organisation which supports its members, the libraries of SUNY.

Campuses

All SUNY colleges are in New York State, except for Jamestown Community College and SUNY Korea. 

Jamestown Community College operates its Warren Center in Pennsylvania under a contract with the Warren-Forest Higher Education Council and the center is licensed by the Pennsylvania Department of Education. The Warren Center is 25 miles south of Jamestown, New York on the grounds of Warren State Hospital, in North Warren, Pennsylvania.

SUNY Korea was opened by the government of South Korea in Incheon, South Korea in 2012, in conjunction with SUNY. As of 2023, it offers undergraduate and graduate programs, with faculty from Stony Brook University and the Fashion Institute of Technology. 

SUNY's sole law school is the University at Buffalo School of Law.

Doctoral degree granting institutions

University centers

 University at Buffalo (flagship)
 Stony Brook University (flagship)
 Binghamton University
 University at Albany
 SUNY New Paltz

Specialized doctoral degree granting institutions

 Upstate Medical University
 Downstate Medical Center
 College of Environmental Science and Forestry
 College of Optometry
 Polytechnic Institute
 One statutory college at Alfred University:
 New York State College of Ceramics
 Four statutory colleges at Cornell University:
 College of Agriculture and Life Sciences (CALS) (which includes the New York State Agricultural Experiment Station in Geneva)
 College of Human Ecology (HumEc)
 College of Veterinary Medicine
 School of Industrial and Labor Relations (ILR School)

University colleges

 Buffalo State University
 Empire State College
 Purchase College
 State University of New York at Geneseo
 State University of New York at Oswego
 State University of New York at Potsdam
 SUNY Cortland
 SUNY Oneonta
 SUNY Fredonia
 SUNY Plattsburgh
 SUNY Brockport
 The College at Old Westbury

Technology colleges

 Alfred State College
 Farmingdale State College
 SUNY Morrisville
 SUNY Canton
 SUNY Cobleskill
 SUNY Delhi
 SUNY Maritime College

Community colleges

 SUNY Adirondack
 SUNY Broome
 Cayuga Community College
 Clinton Community College
 Columbia-Greene Community College
 Corning Community College
 Dutchess Community College
 SUNY Erie
 Fashion Institute of Technology
 Finger Lakes Community College
 Fulton-Montgomery Community College
 Genesee Community College
 Herkimer County Community College
 Hudson Valley Community College
 Jamestown Community College
 Jefferson Community College
 Mohawk Valley Community College
 Monroe Community College
 Nassau Community College
 Niagara County Community College
 North Country Community College (The College of Essex & Franklin)
 Onondaga Community College
 Orange County Community College
 Rockland Community College
 SUNY Schenectady
 Suffolk County Community College
 Sullivan County Community College
 Tompkins Cortland Community College (TC3)
 Ulster County Community College
 Westchester Community College

Medical centers and hospitals 

The State University of New York operates three academic medical centers and their associated university hospitals throughout the state: 
 Upstate University Hospital, Norton College of Medicine in Syracuse
 Stony Brook University Hospital, Stony Brook University in Stony Brook
 Downstate Medical Center, Downstate College of Medicine in Brooklyn
Jacobs School of Medicine in Buffalo, the only school in the SUNY system without its own medical center
The SUNY system is also home to the College of Optometry established in New York City in 1971.

Each medical center serves as the primary teaching site for that campus's medical school. SUNY medical programs have consistently ranked in the top 90 in both research and primary care categories, according to annual rankings published by U.S. News & World Report. The teaching hospitals affiliated with each school are also highly regarded and in 2020 all three medical centers generated US$3.4 billion through patient care accounting for 27.4% of total SUNY revenue.In the latter half of the 20th century, the SUNY hospitals became the cores of full-fledged regional health systems; they were gradually supplemented by many outpatient clinics, offices, and institutes. SUNY medical centers currently play a major role in providing healthcare to the most-needy and marginalized populations and serve large numbers of patients who are uninsured, under-insured or covered by Medicare and Medicaid programs.
In 2020, medical school applications increased by 20.4% at SUNY medical schools systemwide, with schools receiving over 24,118 applications from students for only 685 seats.

With rising interest in medicine, SUNY Chancellor Jim Malatras announced the first statewide initiative, the Pre-Med Opportunity Program, to help more EOP students get accepted into SUNY's medical schools in February 2021. Later in the year in May, 25 college students in junior/senior standing from 10 SUNY schools were selected to receive academic guidance at the Norton College of Medicine while pursuing their medical degrees. The SUNY system will cover all costs for the summer academic enrichment program and the program will expand over the next few years.

SUNY medical, health professions and nursing schools graduate more than 11,000 health professionals annually, including one of three physicians (1 in 33 in the United States), nearly one of every three nurses and one of four dentists in the state.

Statistics

University centers 
New York's largest public university by enrollment is the State University of New York at Buffalo, which was founded by U.S President and Vice President Millard Fillmore. Buffalo has an enrollment total of approximately 32,000 students and receives the most applications out of all SUNY schools.

Costs 
For the 2017–2018 academic year, tuition costs at SUNY schools for an undergraduate degree are less than two-thirds the cost of most public colleges in the United States. For example, tuition at the University at Buffalo for an undergraduate degree is $9,828 per semester or $27,068 per year for non-resident students. Undergraduate tuition for non-resident students at the University of Maryland is $35,216 per year.

Non-resident tuition and fees at University of Oregon are $32,535 per year.

New York State also offers free tuition for all public college and universities for families who have an income of lower than $125,000 and are residents of the state. Other requirements to qualify for free SUNY education include full-time enrollment and staying in the state for a number of years after graduating. In the 2017-2018 award year, 70,694 SUNY students received the Federal Pell Grant.

For the 2019–2020 academic year, medical school tuition costs at the Norton College of Medicine for the M.D. program were: $43,670 (in-state) and $65,160 (out-of-state). Tuition costs across all SUNY medical schools are similar to those at Norton and the cost is less than the average cost of medical schools in the United States.

Research funding

Athletics 

Every school within the SUNY system manages its own athletics program, which greatly varies the level of competition at each institution.

NCAA and NJCAA

Division I
The four university centers compete at the Division I level for all of their sports. All but Binghamton field football teams, with Buffalo in Division I FBS (formerly Division I-A) and Albany and Stony Brook in Division I FCS (formerly Division I-AA). The four Cornell statutory colleges compete as part of the university as a member of the Ivy League, an FCS conference that chooses not to participate in the FCS postseason tournament.

Divisions II and III
Most SUNY colleges, technical schools and community schools compete at the NCAA Division III level. The State University of New York Athletic Conference consists entirely of SUNY colleges.

Other associations

SUNY Delhi is a member of the NAIA.
SUNY Canton and SUNY Environmental Science and Forestry are members of the USCAA.
A small number of community colleges compete at the National Junior College Athletic Association throughout their three divisions.

Rivalries
The most prominent intra-SUNY rivalry is between the Albany Great Danes and Binghamton Bearcats. The two belong to the America East Conference. Frequently referred to as the I-88 Rivalry, Binghamton and Albany sit at either end of Interstate 88 (roughly 2.5 hours apart). Both teams are known to post the highest visitor attendance at either school's athletic events. Both schools also have less intense rivalries with a fellow America East member, the Stony Brook Seawolves. In football, a sport not sponsored by the America East, Albany and Stony Brook have a rivalry in the Colonial Athletic Association.

The University at Buffalo tends to have a rivalry in basketball with two private colleges in the same geographical area. Canisius College and Buffalo's South Campus are 2.5 miles apart on Main St. in Buffalo. Their other rival is Niagara University in Lewiston, NY. All three share rivalries with Saint Bonaventure University, another private college 70 miles south of Buffalo.

SUNY Oswego and SUNY Plattsburgh also share a notable rivalry in Division III Hockey, with that game almost always having the SUNYAC regular season title up for grabs.

SUNY Cobleskill and SUNY Delhi rivalry focuses on basketball, cross country, and previously track, although Cobleskill track and field started competing at the NCAA Division III level in spring 2009. The SUNY Delhi 2003-2004 basketball season was canceled after a basketball game was called with 48 seconds left after several SUNY Delhi basketball players nearly started a brawl in the Ioro Gymnasium at SUNY Cobleskill on Wednesday February 4, 2004.

SUNY Oneonta has developed a rivalry in almost every sport with SUNY Cortland. They share the red dragon as a team nickname, and their matchups are known as the "Battle of the Red Dragons".

There is an unusual sports rivalry between SUNY College of Environmental Science and Forestry and Finger Lakes Community College, with both campuses sponsoring nationally ranked teams in woodsman competitions.

SUNY Chancellor's Awards 
The SUNY Chancellor’s Awards for Excellence are conferred to acknowledge and provide recognition for superior achievement and to encourage the ongoing pursuit of academic excellence. 

The SUNY Chancellor's Award for Student Excellence acknowledges students for outstanding achievements and is the highest honor bestowed upon a student by the University. The faculty-staff awards include the Chancellor's Award for Excellence, Distinguished Faculty ranks, Conversations in the Disciplines, the Shared Governance Award, and the Chancellor’s Award for Excellence in Adjunct Teaching.

See also

SUNY Press
Education in New York (state)
List of colleges and universities in New York
List of largest United States colleges by enrollment
List of largest universities by enrollment

References

External links

 
 Official SUNY Press website
 State University of New York (datasets) at Open NY

 
Educational institutions established in 1948
New York, SUNY
1948 establishments in New York (state)
New York State Education Department
Public universities and colleges in New York (state)